Sven Vanthourenhout (born 14 January 1981 in Bruges) is a Belgian cycling coach and former professional racing cyclist, primarily riding cyclo-cross. Since 2017, Vanthourenhout has been the coach of the Belgian national cyclo-cross team, and in 2020 became the coach of the national road cycling team as well.

Career highlights

1997
 3rd in National Championship, Road, Novices, Belgium (BEL)
 1st in National Championship, Cyclo-cross, Debutants, Belgium, Mol (BEL)
 1st in Praha, Cyclo-cross, Juniors (CZE)
1998
 2nd in Ledegem – Kemmel – Ledegem, Juniors (BEL)
 1st in National Championship, Cyclo-cross, Juniors, Belgium, Ruddervoorde (BEL)
1999
 2nd in World Championship, Cyclo-cross, Juniors, Poprad
 1st in National Championship, Cyclo-cross, Juniors, Belgium, Soumagne (BEL)
 2nd in Eernegem Cyclocross (BEL)
2000
 3rd in National Championship, Cyclo-cross, U23, Belgium, Gent(Blaarmeersen) (BEL)
 3rd in Langemark, Cyclo-cross (BEL)
 1st in Oostende, Cyclo-cross (BEL)
 1st in Bredene, Cyclo-cross (BEL)
 2nd in Dudzele, Cyclo-cross (BEL)
 3rd in Eernegem Cyclocross (BEL)
 3rd in Oelegem, Cyclo-cross (BEL)
2001
 1st in World Championship, Cyclo-cross, U23
 1st in National Championship, Cyclo-cross, U23, Belgium, Mol (BEL)
 1st in Langemark, Cyclo-cross (BEL)
 3rd in Oostmalle, Cyclo-cross (BEL)
 1st in Oostende, Cyclo-cross (BEL)
 3rd in Ardooie, Cyclo-cross (BEL)
 1st in Middelkerke, Cyclo-cross (BEL)
 2nd in Bredene, Cyclo-cross (BEL)
 2nd in La Cerisaie-Ballan, Cyclo-cross (FRA)
 3rd in Zonnebeke, Cyclo-cross (BEL)
 3rd in Wielsbeke, Cyclo-cross (BEL)
 1st in Veldegem, Cyclo-cross (BEL)
2002
 3rd in Ardooie, Cyclo-cross (BEL)
 1st in Eernegem Cyclocross (BEL)
 1st in GP Briek Schotte (a) (BEL)
 1st in Beuvry, Cyclo-cross (FRA)
 3rd in National Championship, Cyclo-cross, Elite, Belgium, Koksijde (BEL)
 2nd in Pijnacker-Nootdorp, Cyclo-cross (NED)
 3rd in Harnes, Cyclo-cross (FRA)
 3rd in Eeklo, Cyclo-cross (BEL)
 3rd in Dottignies, Cyclo-cross (BEL)
 2nd in Tabor, Cyclo-cross (CZE)
 2nd in Veldegem, Cyclo-cross (BEL)
2003
 1st in Dudzele, Cyclo-cross (BEL)
 1st in Oostende, Cyclo-cross (BEL)
 1st in Zonnebeke, Cyclo-cross (BEL)
 3rd in National Championship, Road, Elite, Belgium, Vilvoorde (BEL)
 3rd in Ruddervoorde, Cyclo-cross (BEL)
 3rd in Sint-Michielsgestel, Cyclo-cross (NED)
 2nd in Eernegem Cyclocross (BEL)
 1st in Veldegem, Cyclo-cross, Veldegem (BEL)
2004
 1st in Raismes, Cyclo-cross (FRA)
 1st in Otegem, Cyclo-cross (BEL)
 3rd in World Championship, Cyclo-cross, Elite, Pont-Château (FRA)
 1st in Harnes, Cyclo-cross, Harnes (FRA)
 2nd in Eeklo, Cyclo-cross (BEL)
 2nd in GP de Eecloonaar, Eeklo (BEL)
 3rd in Oostmalle, Cyclo-cross (BEL)
 1st in Dudzele, Cyclo-cross (BEL)
 3rd in Genk, Cyclo-cross (BEL)
 3rd in Aalter, Cyclo-cross (BEL)
 2nd in Wortegem-Petegem, Cyclo-cross, Wortegem-Petegem (BEL)
 1st in Ardooie, Cyclo-cross (BEL)
 1st in Middelkerke, Cyclo-cross (BEL)
 1st in Hamme-Zogge, Cyclo-cross (BEL)
 2nd in Tabor, Cyclo-cross (CZE)
 3rd in Dottignies, Cyclo-cross (BEL)
 3rd in Sint-Michielsgestel, Cyclo-cross (NED)
 1st in Eernegem Cyclocross (BEL)
 3rd in Niel, Cyclo-cross (BEL)
 3rd in Pijnacker-Nootdorp, Cyclo-cross (NED)
 3rd in Lebbeke, Cyclo-cross (BEL)
 3rd in Overijse, Cyclo-cross (BEL)
 3rd in Diegem, Cyclo-cross (BEL)
 2nd in Loenhout, Cyclo-cross (BEL)
2005
 3rd in Baal, Cyclo-cross (BEL)
 1st in Aigle, Cyclo-cross (SUI)
 1st in Otegem, Cyclo-cross (BEL)
 3rd in Nommay, Cyclo-cross (FRA)
 1st in Zonnebeke, Cyclo-cross (BEL)
 3rd in Hoogerheide, Cyclo-cross (NED)
 3rd in World Championship, Cyclo-cross, Elite, Sankt-Wendel
 3rd in Lille (-B-), Cyclo-cross (BEL)
 2nd in Hoogstraten, Cyclo-cross (BEL)
 1st in Eeklo, Cyclo-cross (BEL)
 3rd in General Classification Superprestige, Cyclo-cross
 2nd in General Classification Gazet van Antwerpen Trofee (BEL)
 3rd in Oostmalle, Cyclo-cross (BEL)
 2nd in Waregem (BEL)
 3rd in Trofee Jong Maar Moedig I.W.T. (BEL)
 1st in Dudzele, Cyclo-cross (BEL)
 3rd in Erpe-Mere , Cyclo-cross (BEL)
 3rd in Dottignies, Cyclo-cross (BEL)
 2nd in Ardooie, Cyclo-cross (BEL)
 3rd in Lebbeke, Cyclo-cross (BEL)
 2nd in Eernegem Cyclocross (BEL)
 3rd in Koksijde, Cyclo-cross (BEL)
 1st in Wachtebeke, Cyclo-cross (BEL)
 1st in Middelkerke, Cyclo-cross (BEL)
2006
 1st in Otegem, Cyclo-cross (BEL)
 3rd in Antwerpen, Cyclo-cross (BEL)
 1st in Zonnebeke, Cyclo-cross (BEL)
 3rd in Hoogstraten, Cyclo-cross (BEL)
 2nd in Vorselaar, Cyclo-cross (BEL)
 1st in Württemberg Strasse (GER)
 3rd in General Classification OZ Wielerweekend (NED)
 1st in Dudzele, Cyclo-cross, Dudzele (BEL)
 2nd in Aalter, Cyclo-cross (BEL)
 1st in Eernegem Cyclocross (BEL)
 3rd in Zonhoven, Cyclo-cross (BEL)
 2nd in Ruddervoorde, Cyclo-cross (BEL)
 2nd in Lebbeke, Cyclo-cross (BEL)
 1st in Knokke-Heist, Cyclo-cross (BEL)
 3rd in Koksijde, Cyclo-cross (BEL)
 3rd in Milano, Cyclo-cross (ITA)
 2nd in Overijse, Cyclo-cross (BEL)
 3rd in Wachtebeke, Cyclo-cross (BEL)
 1st in Torhout-Wijnendale, Cyclo-cross (BEL)
2007
 2nd in Otegem, Cyclo-cross (BEL)
 3rd in Indoorcross Mechelen, Cyclo-cross (BEL)
 1st in Zonnebeke, Cyclo-cross (BEL)
 2nd in Ardooie, Cyclo-cross (BEL)
 2nd in Eernegem Cyclocross (BEL)
 2nd in Asteasu, Cyclo-cross (ESP)
2008
 2nd in Zonnebeke, Cyclo-cross (BEL)

References

External links

1981 births
Living people
Sportspeople from Bruges
Cyclists from West Flanders
Belgian male cyclists
Cyclo-cross cyclists